Roger that may refer to:

 Radio phraseology, see Radiotelephony procedure
 "Roger That" (song), a song by rap-label and group Young Money Entertainment